Emory Lawrence Bennett (December 20, 1929 – June 24, 1951) was a United States Army soldier in the Korean War who posthumously received the U.S. military's highest decoration, the Medal of Honor.

Biography
Bennett was born in New Smyrna Beach, Florida on December 20, 1929. His family moved to Indianola on Merritt Island when he was six and to Cocoa in  1937. His parents ran "Bennett Fish Market", and he helped catch fish in the nearby Indian River to sell. The family supplemented their diet by duck hunting, and Emory proved a crack shot. He had three older brothers: Gary, Marvin and John. Bennett graduated from Cocoa High School in 1948 and enlisted in the Army on July 25, 1950.

Bennett served in Korea as a private first class with Company B of the 1st Battalion, 15th Infantry Regiment, 3rd Infantry Division. In the early morning hours of June 24, 1951, two enemy battalions launched a human wave attack against his company's defensive position near Sobangsan. Bennett left his foxhole and stood exposed to hostile fire in order to attack with his automatic rifle. Although wounded, he maintained this position long enough to momentarily halt the enemy advance and allow Company B to regroup. The assault resumed, however, and the company was forced to pull back. Bennett voluntarily stayed behind to provide covering fire while the rest of the unit withdrew, during which time he was mortally wounded. For these actions, he was posthumously awarded the Medal of Honor six months later, on February 1, 1952.

His body arrived home on November 23, 1951. He is interred at Pinecrest Cemetery in Cocoa, Florida.

Medal of Honor citation
Bennett's official Medal of Honor citation reads:

PFC Bennett a member of Company B, distinguished himself by conspicuous gallantry and intrepidity at the risk of his life above and beyond the call of duty in action against an armed enemy of the United Nations. At approximately 0200 hours, 2 enemy battalions swarmed up the ridge line in a ferocious banzai charge in an attempt to dislodge PFC Bennett's company from its defensive positions. Meeting the challenge, the gallant defenders delivered destructive retaliation, but the enemy pressed the assault with fanatical determination and the integrity of the perimeter was imperiled. Fully aware of the odds against him, PFC Bennett unhesitatingly left his foxhole, moved through withering fire, stood within full view of the enemy, and, employing his automatic rifle, poured crippling fire into the ranks of the onrushing assailants, inflicting numerous casualties. Although wounded, PFC Bennett gallantly maintained his 1-man defense and the attack was momentarily halted. During this lull in battle, the company regrouped for counterattack, but the numerically superior foe soon infiltrated into the position. Upon orders to move back, PFC Bennett voluntarily remained to provide covering fire for the withdrawing elements, and, defying the enemy, continued to sweep the charging foe with devastating fire until mortally wounded. His willing self-sacrifice and intrepid actions saved the position from being overrun and enabled the company to effect an orderly withdrawal. PFC Bennett's unflinching courage and consummate devotion to duty reflect lasting glory on himself and the military service.

Awards and decorations

See also

Emory L. Bennett Causeway
List of Korean War Medal of Honor recipients

References

External links

 Photo Album

 

1929 births
1951 deaths
American military personnel killed in the Korean War
United States Army Medal of Honor recipients
People from Cocoa, Florida
Korean War recipients of the Medal of Honor
People from New Smyrna Beach, Florida
Military personnel from Florida
United States Army personnel of the Korean War
United States Army soldiers